Jack Ridl (born April 10, 1944) is an American poet, and was a professor of English at Hope College.

Life and career
Ridl's father, Charles "Buzz" Ridl, coached basketball at Westminster College, Pennsylvania and the University of Pittsburgh. Ridl graduated from Westminster College, Pennsylvania with a BA in 1967 and M.Ed., in 1970. He lives in Laketown Township, Michigan, with his wife, Julie.

His work has appeared in LIT, The Georgia Review, FIELD, Poetry, Ploughshares, Prairie Schooner, Gulf Coast, The Denver Quarterly, Chelsea, Free Lunch, The Journal, Passages North, Dunes Review, and Poetry East. Hope College has named its Visiting Writers Series for him.

Awards
 2013 ForeWord Reviews' INDIEFAB Book of the Year Award for Practicing to Walk Like a Heron—Winner of the Gold Medal in the category of Poetry (Adult Nonfiction)
 2007 Society of Midland Authors Award for Broken Symmetry in the category of Poetry
 2002 Say-the-Word Poetry Award from The Ellipse Art Center in Arlington, Virginia, for "The Dry Wallers Listen to Sinatra While They Work", chosen by David St. John
 2001 Chapbook Award from The Center for Book Arts in New York City, for Against Elegies,  selected by Sharon Dolin and Billy Collins
 1996, The Carnegie Foundation named him Michigan Professor of the Year.

Works
 
 After School, Samisdat Press. 1988.
 
 Against Elegies, The Center for Book Arts, (2001)
 
 
 Practicing to Walk Like a Heron. Wayne State University Press. 2013. .

Non-fiction

Editor
   (2nd edition 2008)
   (2nd edition 2008)

References

External links
"Author's blog"
"Jack Ridl", The Writer's Almanac
"An Interview with Jack Ridl", Through the 3rd Eye
"Perfectly Imperfect": Jack Ridl at TEDxMacatawa

1944 births
American male poets
Hope College faculty
Westminster College (Pennsylvania) alumni
Living people